Boudu Saved from Drowning ("Boudu saved from the waters") is a 1932 French social satire comedy of manners film directed by Jean Renoir. Renoir wrote the film's screenplay, from the 1919 play by René Fauchois. The film stars Michel Simon as Boudu.

Pauline Kael called it, "not only a lovely fable about a bourgeois attempt to reform an early hippie... but a photographic record of an earlier France."

Synopsis
Bourgeois Parisian and Latin Quarter bookseller Edouard Lestingois rescues Boudu, a tramp, from a suicidal plunge into the River Seine from the Pont des Arts. Boudu is brought into Lestingois's household. The family adopts the man and dedicates itself to reforming him into a proper, middle-class person. Boudu shows his gratitude by shaking the household to its foundations, challenging the hidebound manners of his hosts, seducing the housemaid and raping Madame Lestingois. Gradually Boudu is tamed, shaved and given a haircut, and put in a suit. Then he wins a large sum of money on the lottery, and he is guided into marrying the housemaid. Finally, however, at the wedding scene, Boudu capsizes a rowboat and floats away from the wedding party, and "back to his old vagrancy, a free spirit once more."

Cast
 Michel Simon as Priape Boudu
 Charles Granval as Edouard Lestingois
 Marcelle Hainia as Emma Lestingois
 Sévérine Lerczinska as Chloe Anne Marie, la bonne
 Jean Gehret as Vigour
 Max Dalban as Godin
 Jean Dasté as L'etudiant
 Jacques Becker as Poet on park bench

Notes
Renoir changed the ending of René Fauchois's play. The play ends with the marriage of Boudu and Anne-Marie, whereas in Renoir's film, Boudu escapes 'from holy padlock' and heads for ' a future of independent, vagrant liberty.' Initially angry, according to Renoir, Fauchois threatened to have his name removed from the credits, but later changed his mind, and (in Cinéma 56, no.7, November 1955) said: "I have just seen the film again and I admired it and am happy to say so. As a very free adaptation of my work, Boudu belongs to Renoir." (Fauchois's career started as an actor with the Sarah-Bernhardt company, and in 1925 when Michel Simon played Boudu on the stage Fauchois was Lestingois.) In narrative terms, another major change by Renoir from the play, consists in shifting the centre of attention from the character of Lestingois to that of Boudu.

Michel Simon was at various times, a boxer, a boxing instructor, a right-wing anarchist, a frequenter of prostitutes, pimps and petty crooks. He was extremely well read, a talented photographer, a hypochondriac, a misanthrope, owner of a vast collection of pornography and with a reputation for unorthodox sexual behaviour which he did not bother to deny. The writer Richard Boston has stated that, "Whether or not he was a pleasant man, he was certainly a complex one, with a good deal of Boudu in him," and Renoir called Simon "a genius of an actor...Boudu was conceived primarily to make use of the genius of Michel Simon."

Michel Simon called Boudu a pique-assiette, a sponger, while the writer Richard Boston rejected the idea that Boudu had much in common with the hippies of the late 1960s, as Pauline Kael had suggested. "The Oxford English Dictionary says that hippie is a hipster; a person usually exotically dressed; a beatnik. None of this sounds remotely like Boudu. Boudu doesn't reject conventional values: he never had them in the first place: you wouldn't catch him doing anything as pussy-footing as 'rejecting conventional values.' " Rather, Boston argues, Boudu is what the French call a marginal. Boudu is anarchic, chaotic, and finally, a fool. An archetype, "these agents of chaos act out our secret desires. If we see a big bum we might want to kick it: Chaplin does kick it...Laurel and Hardy, the Marx Brothers, Boudu, and Hulot are the enemies of conformity, of what can be regulated. They are the awkward squad."

Remake
The film was remade for an American audience as Down and Out in Beverly Hills (1986), directed by Paul Mazursky. For another remake, Boudu (2005). Gérard Jugnot directed, from a screenplay by Philippe Lopes-Curval. It starred Gérard Depardieu as Boudu.

See also
 List of films with a 100% rating on Rotten Tomatoes, a film review aggregator website

References

External links
 
 
 
Boudu Saved from Drowning: Tramping in the City an essay by Christopher Faulkner at the Criterion Collection
 Review at The Factual Opinion

1932 films
1930s French-language films
1932 comedy films
Films about poverty in France
French films based on plays
Films directed by Jean Renoir
Films set in Paris
French black-and-white films
French satirical films
French comedy films
1930s French films